Fuel efficiency is a form of thermal efficiency, meaning the ratio of effort to result of a process that converts chemical potential energy contained in a carrier (fuel) into kinetic energy or work. Overall fuel efficiency may vary per device, which in turn may vary per application, and this spectrum of variance is often illustrated as a continuous energy profile. Non-transportation applications, such as industry, benefit from increased fuel efficiency, especially fossil fuel power plants or industries dealing with combustion, such as ammonia production during the Haber process.

In the context of transport, fuel economy is the energy efficiency of a particular vehicle,  given as a ratio of distance traveled per unit of fuel consumed. It is dependent on several factors  including engine efficiency, transmission design, and tire design. In most countries, using the metric system, fuel economy is stated as "fuel consumption" in liters per 100 kilometers (L/100 km) or kilometers per liter (km/L or kmpl). In a number of countries still using other systems, fuel economy is expressed in miles per gallon (mpg), for example in the US and usually also in the UK (imperial gallon); there is sometimes confusion as the imperial gallon is 20% larger than the US gallon so that mpg values are not directly comparable.  Traditionally, litres per mil were used in Norway and Sweden, but both have aligned to the EU standard of L/100 km. 

Fuel consumption is a more accurate measure of a vehicle's performance because it is a linear relationship while fuel economy leads to distortions in efficiency improvements. Weight-specific efficiency (efficiency per unit weight) may be stated for freight, and passenger-specific efficiency (vehicle efficiency per passenger) for passenger vehicles.

Vehicle design
Fuel efficiency is dependent on many parameters of a vehicle, including its engine parameters, aerodynamic drag, weight, AC usage, fuel and rolling resistance. There have been advances in all areas of vehicle design in recent decades. Fuel efficiency of vehicles can also be improved by careful maintenance and driving habits.

Hybrid vehicles use two or more power sources for propulsion. In many designs, a small combustion engine is combined with electric motors.  Kinetic energy which would otherwise be lost to heat during braking is recaptured as electrical power to improve fuel efficiency. The larger batteries in these vehicles power the car's electronics, allowing the engine to shut off and avoid prolonged idling.

Fleet efficiency
Fleet efficiency describes the average efficiency of a population of vehicles.  Technological advances in efficiency may be offset by a change in buying habits with a propensity to heavier vehicles, which are less efficient, all else being equal.

Energy efficiency terminology
Energy efficiency is similar to fuel efficiency but the input is usually in units of energy such as megajoules (MJ), kilowatt-hours (kW·h), kilocalories (kcal) or British thermal units (BTU). The inverse of "energy efficiency" is "energy intensity", or the amount of input energy required for a unit of output such as MJ/passenger-km (of passenger transport), BTU/ton-mile or kJ/t-km (of freight transport), GJ/t (for production of steel and other materials), BTU/(kW·h) (for electricity generation), or litres/100 km (of vehicle travel). Litres per 100 km is also a measure of "energy intensity" where the input is measured by the amount of fuel and the output is measured by the distance travelled.  For example: Fuel economy in automobiles.

Given a heat value of a fuel, it would be trivial to convert from fuel units (such as litres of gasoline) to energy units (such as MJ) and conversely. But there are two problems with comparisons made using energy units:
 There are two different heat values for any hydrogen-containing fuel which can differ by several percent (see below).
 When comparing transportation energy costs, it must be remembered that a kilowatt hour of electric energy may require an amount of fuel with heating value of 2 or 3 kilowatt hours to produce it.

Energy content of fuel

The specific energy content of a fuel is the heat energy obtained when a certain quantity is burned (such as a gallon, litre, kilogram).  It is sometimes called the heat of combustion.  There exists two different values of specific heat energy for the same batch of fuel.  One is the high (or gross) heat of combustion and the other is the low (or net) heat of combustion.  The high value is obtained when, after the combustion, the water in the exhaust is in liquid form.  For the low value, the exhaust has all the water in vapor form (steam).  Since water vapor gives up heat energy when it changes from vapor to liquid, the liquid water value is larger since it includes the latent heat of vaporization of water.  The difference between the high and low values is significant, about 8 or 9%.  This accounts for most of the apparent discrepancy in the heat value of gasoline. In the U.S. (and the table) the high heat values have traditionally been used, but in many other countries, the low heat values are commonly used.

Neither the gross heat of combustion nor the net heat of combustion gives the theoretical amount of mechanical energy (work) that can be obtained from the reaction. (This is given by the change in Gibbs free energy, and is around 45.7 MJ/kg for gasoline.) The actual amount of mechanical work obtained from fuel (the inverse of the specific fuel consumption) depends on the engine. A figure of 17.6 MJ/kg is possible with a gasoline engine, and 19.1 MJ/kg for a diesel engine. See Brake specific fuel consumption for more information.

Fuel efficiency of motor vehicles

Measurement
The fuel efficiency of motor vehicles can be expressed in more ways:
 Fuel consumption is the amount of fuel used per unit distance; for example, litres per 100 kilometres (L/100 km). The lower the value, the more economic a vehicle is (the less fuel it needs to travel a certain distance); this is the measure generally used across Europe (except the UK, Denmark and The Netherlands - see below), New Zealand, Australia and Canada. Also in Uruguay, Paraguay, Guatemala, Colombia, China, and Madagascar., as also in post-Soviet space.
 Fuel economy is the distance travelled per unit volume of fuel used; for example, kilometres per litre (km/L) or miles per gallon (MPG), where 1 MPG (imperial) ≈ 0.354006 km/L.  The higher the value, the more economic a vehicle is (the more distance it can travel with a certain volume of fuel). This measure is popular in the US and the UK (mpg), but in Europe, India, Japan, South Korea and Latin America the metric unit km/L is used instead.

In parts of Europe, the two standard measuring cycles for "litre/100 km" value are "urban" traffic with speeds up to 50 km/h from a cold start, and then "extra urban" travel at various speeds up to 120 km/h which follows the urban test. A combined figure is also quoted showing the total fuel consumed in divided by the total distance traveled in both tests.

Statistics

A reasonably modern European supermini and many mid-size cars, including station wagons, may manage motorway travel at 5 L/100 km (47 mpg US/56 mpg imp) or 6.5 L/100 km in city traffic (36 mpg US/43 mpg imp), with carbon dioxide emissions of around 140 g/km.

An average North American mid-size car travels 21 mpg (US) (11 L/100 km) city, 27 mpg (US) (9 L/100 km) highway; a full-size SUV usually travels 13 mpg (US) (18 L/100 km) city and 16 mpg (US) (15 L/100 km) highway.  Pickup trucks vary considerably; whereas a 4 cylinder-engined light pickup can achieve 28 mpg (8 L/100 km), a V8 full-size pickup with extended cabin only travels 13 mpg (US) (18 L/100 km) city and 15 mpg (US) (15 L/100 km) highway.

The average fuel economy for all vehicles on the road is higher in Europe than the United States because the higher cost of fuel changes consumer behaviour. In the UK, a gallon of gas without tax would cost US$1.97, but with taxes cost US$6.06 in 2005. The average cost in the United States was US$2.61.

European-built cars are generally more fuel-efficient than US vehicles. While Europe has many higher efficiency diesel cars, European gasoline vehicles are on average also more efficient than gasoline-powered vehicles in the USA. Most European vehicles cited in the CSI study run on diesel engines, which tend to achieve greater fuel efficiency than gas engines. Selling those cars in the United States is difficult because of emission standards, notes Walter McManus, a fuel economy expert at the University of Michigan Transportation Research Institute. "For the most part, European diesels don’t meet U.S. emission standards", McManus said in 2007. Another reason why many European models are not marketed in the United States is that labor unions object to having the big 3 import any new foreign built models regardless of fuel economy while laying off workers at home.

An example of European cars' capabilities of fuel economy is the microcar Smart Fortwo cdi, which can achieve up to 3.4 L/100 km (69.2 mpg US) using a turbocharged three-cylinder 41 bhp (30 kW) Diesel engine. The Fortwo is produced by Daimler AG and is only sold by one company in the United States.

Diesel engines generally achieve greater fuel efficiency than petrol (gasoline) engines. Passenger car diesel engines have energy efficiency of up to 41% but more typically 30%, and petrol engines of up to 37.3%, but more typically 20%. A common margin is 25% more miles per gallon for an efficient turbodiesel.

The higher compression ratio is helpful in raising the energy efficiency, but diesel fuel also contains approximately 10% more energy per unit volume than gasoline which contributes to the reduced fuel consumption for a given power output.

In 2002, the United States had 85,174,776 trucks, and averaged .

A study indicates that a 10% increase in gas prices will eventually produce a 2.04% increase in fuel economy. One method by car makers to increase fuel efficiency is lightweighting in which lighter-weight materials are substituted in for improved engine performance and handling.

Fuel efficiency in microgravity

How fuel combusts affects how much energy is produced. The National Aeronautics and Space Administration (NASA) has investigated fuel consumption in microgravity.

The common distribution of a flame under normal gravity conditions depends on convection, because soot tends to rise to the top of a flame, such as in a candle, making the flame yellow. In microgravity or zero gravity, such as an environment in outer space, convection no longer occurs, and the flame becomes spherical, with a tendency to become more blue and more efficient. There are several possible explanations for this difference, of which the most likely one given is the hypothesis that the temperature is evenly distributed enough that soot is not formed and complete combustion occurs., National Aeronautics and Space Administration, April 2005. Experiments by NASA in microgravity reveal that diffusion flames in microgravity allow more soot to be completely oxidised after they are produced than diffusion flames on Earth, because of a series of mechanisms that behaved differently in microgravity when compared to normal gravity conditions.LSP-1 experiment results, National Aeronautics and Space Administration, April 2005. Premixed flames in microgravity burn at a much slower rate and more efficiently than even a candle on Earth, and last much longer.

Transportation

Fuel efficiency in transportation

Vehicle efficiency and transportation pollution 

Fuel efficiency directly affects emissions causing pollution by affecting the amount of fuel used. However, it also depends on the fuel source used to drive the vehicle concerned. Cars for example, can run on a number of fuel types other than gasoline, such as natural gas, LPG or biofuel or electricity which creates various quantities of atmospheric pollution.

A kilogram of carbon, whether contained in petrol, diesel, kerosene, or any other hydrocarbon fuel in a vehicle, leads to approximately 3.6 kg of CO2 emissions.  Due to the carbon content of gasoline, its combustion emits 2.3 kg/L (19.4 lb/US gal) of CO2; since diesel fuel is more energy dense per unit volume, diesel emits 2.6 kg/L (22.2 lb/US gal).  This figure is only the CO2 emissions of the final fuel product and does not include additional CO2 emissions created during the drilling, pumping, transportation and refining steps required to produce the fuel. Additional measures to reduce overall emission includes improvements to the efficiency of air conditioners, lights and tires.

Driving technique

Many drivers have the potential to improve their fuel efficiency significantly. These five basic fuel-efficient driving techniques can be effective. Simple things such as keeping tires properly inflated, having a vehicle well-maintained and avoiding idling can dramatically improve fuel efficiency.

There is a growing community of enthusiasts known as hypermilers who develop and practice driving techniques to increase fuel efficiency and reduce consumption. Hypermilers have broken records of fuel efficiency, for example, achieving 109 miles per gallon in a Prius.

Advanced technology improvements to improve fuel efficiency
The most efficient machines for converting energy to rotary motion are electric motors, as used in electric vehicles. However, electricity is not a primary energy source so the efficiency of the electricity production has also to be taken into account. Railway trains can be powered using electricity, delivered through an additional running rail, overhead catenary system or by on-board generators used in diesel-electric locomotives as common on the US and UK rail networks. Pollution produced from centralised generation of electricity is emitted at a distant power station, rather than "on site". Pollution can be reduced by using more railway electrification and low carbon power for electricity. Some railways, such as the French SNCF and Swiss federal railways derive most, if not 100% of their power, from hydroelectric or nuclear power stations, therefore atmospheric pollution from their rail networks is very low. This was reflected in a study by AEA Technology between a Eurostar train and airline journeys between London and Paris, which showed the trains on average emitting 10 times less CO2, per passenger, than planes, helped in part by French nuclear generation.

Hydrogen fuel cells 
In the future, hydrogen cars may be commercially available. Toyota is test-marketing vehicles powered by hydrogen fuel cells in southern California, where a series of hydrogen fueling stations has been established. Powered either through chemical reactions in a fuel cell that create electricity to drive very efficient electrical motors or by directly burning hydrogen in a combustion engine (near identically to a natural gas vehicle, and similarly compatible with both natural gas and gasoline); these vehicles promise to have near-zero pollution from the tailpipe (exhaust pipe). Potentially the atmospheric pollution could be minimal, provided the hydrogen is made by electrolysis using electricity from non-polluting sources such as solar, wind or hydroelectricity or nuclear. Commercial hydrogen production uses fossil fuels and produces more carbon dioxide than hydrogen.

Because there are pollutants involved in the manufacture and destruction of a car and the production, transmission and storage of electricity and hydrogen, the label "zero pollution" applies only to the car's conversion of stored energy into movement.

In 2004, a consortium of major auto-makers — BMW, General Motors, Honda, Toyota and Volkswagen/Audi — came up with "Top Tier Detergent Gasoline Standard" to gasoline brands in the US and Canada that meet their minimum standards for detergent content and do not contain metallic additives. Top Tier gasoline contains higher levels of detergent additives in order to prevent the build-up of deposits (typically, on fuel injector and intake valve) known to reduce fuel economy and engine performance.

See also

References

External links
 US Government website on fuel economy
 UK DfT comparisons on road and rail
 NASA Offers a $1.5 Million Prize for a Fast and Fuel-Efficient Aircraft 
 Car Fuel Consumption Official Figures
 Spritmonitor.de "the most fuel efficient cars" - Database of thousands of (mostly German) car owners' actual fuel consumption figures (cf. Spritmonitor)
 Searchable fuel economy data from the EPA - United States Environmental Protection Agency
 penghemat bbm - Alat penghemat bbm
 Ny Times: A Road Test of Alternative Fuel Visions

Energy economics
Physical quantities
Energy efficiency
Transport economics